Nassington is a village and civil parish in Northamptonshire, England. At the time of the 2001 census, the parish's population was 670 people, increasing to 827 at the 2011 Census   The River Nene runs along the eastern side of the parish.

The villages name means 'Promontory place farm/settlement'.

The village has existed since at least Anglo-Saxon times, for an Anglo-Saxon hall was taken over by the Viking king, Cnut the Great, as one of his royal halls.  Cnut is known to have visited after 1017, with his court including Aethelric the bishop of Dorchester on Thames.  In 1107 Henry I gave the hall and land to the Bishop of Lincoln, Robert Bloet, to endow a prebend.

The village and manor were featured in episode 117, King Cnut's Manor of Time Team (aired 7 March 2004).

The manor is  now a private home, but the Prebendal Manor and Tithe Barn Museum, and gardens, are open to the paying public on some days.  The gardens only contain plants introduced prior to 1485.

See also
Nassington railway station
William of Nassyngton

References

External links
 
 The Prebendal Manor

Villages in Northamptonshire
North Northamptonshire
Civil parishes in Northamptonshire